On August 21, 2011, NBL Canada held its draft at the Rogers Centre in Toronto.  The first round was a free agent draft with no limits, while the second and third rounds required Canadian players be selected. The Halifax Rainmen's third round draft pick has since been voided due to the paperwork of Jerrell Thompson being mixed up to appear as that of a Canadian, he will be entered as a free agent in the next draft picks.

Draft

References

National Basketball League of Canada Draft
Draft
NL Canada draft
NBL Canada draft
Basketball in Toronto
Events in Toronto